Donja Trešnjica is a village in Serbia. It is situated in the Mali Zvornik municipality, in the Mačva District of Central Serbia. The population of the village is 688 (2002 census) with 682 people comprising the Serb ethnic majority.

Historical population

1948: 886
1953: 968
1961: 1,044
1971: 959
1981: 749
1991: 730
2002: 688

References

See also
List of places in Serbia

Populated places in Mačva District